Summit Pass (el. ) is a high mountain pass in the Northern Canadian Rockies in the province of British Columbia. It is one of two passes the Alaska Highway utilizes to cut westwards across ranges of the Rocky Mountain System; further north is the lower Muncho Pass.

References

External links
Entry at bivouac.com

Mountain passes of British Columbia
Northern Interior of British Columbia
Canadian Rockies